At the 2011 Pan Arab Games, the athletics events are currently being held at Khalifa Stadium in Doha, Qatar from 15 to 20 December. A total of 45 events are to be contested, comprising 23 men's events and 22 for female athletes. The track and field events took place within the stadium while the half marathon was contested on a specially-designed course around the Aspire Zone. The shorter track events have a two-round format with qualifying heats and a final race, while the long-distance races and throwing events are contested in a straight final format with no qualifying rounds. In addition to the elite level programme, a total of 30 para-athletics events were contested between athletes with a disability on 21 and 22 December, comprising 25 men's events and five women's events.

Morocco topped the medal table, as it had in 2007, taking eleven gold medals and 24 medals in total. Qatar and Saudi Arabia had the next highest number of golds (six), while Egypt had the second largest medal haul, with 22 (five of them gold). Athletes from twelve nations reached the top of the podium while fifteen of the 21 competing nations won a medal in the athletics competition.

Morocco's Malika Akkaoui was the most successful athlete of the competition as she won a 400/800 metres double before winning a third gold in the relay. The women's short sprints were dominated by Dana Hussein Abdul-Razzaq and Gretta Taslakian, who were first and second in both events, and Abdul-Razzaq also won a bronze over 400 m. The men's 100 metres was a photo finish between the host nation's Femi Seun Ogunode and Barakat Al-Harthi of Oman – Al-Harthi was initially declared the winner but this was later revised in favour of Ogunode. Abubaker Ali Kamal completed a novel 5000 metres/steeplechase double for Qatar, but was later disqualified for failed a drugs test at the competition. The men's 1500 metres, won by Hassan Ayanleh, was of a high standard as all three medallists achieved the Olympic "A" qualifying mark and runner-up Hamza Driouch became the third fastest youth runner of all time.

Egypt performed well in the men's and women's throws and Yasser Ibrahim Farag won the shot put and took the discus throw silver medal. Algerian Baya Rahouli was a clear winner in the women's triple jump, taking the ninth Pan Arab Games medal of her career. Egypt's Enas Mansour took silver medals in both the women's horizontal jumps. Asian champion Mutaz Essa Barshim, one of Qatar's foremost athletes, cleared 2.30 m to win the men's high jump. Hassanine Sebei and Chaima Trabelsi of Tunisia both retained their racewalking titles from 2007.

An anonymous poll conducted by the World Anti-Doping Agency at the event showed that an estimated 45% of the athletes present at the Arab athletics competition had used a banned substance within the last 12 months.

Medal summary

Elite men

† = Qatar's Abubaker Ali Kamal was the initial winner of the men's 5000 m and steeplechase events, but he was later disqualified as his doping test at the event tested positive for EPO.

Elite women

Men's para-athletics

Women's para-athletics

Medal table

Note: The results of the para-athletics competitions did not count towards neither the athletics, nor the overall medal count.

Para-athletics

Participating nations

 (23)
 (18)
 (6)
 (5)
 (25)
 (14)
 (1)
 (18)
 (5)
 (13)
 (4)
 (37)
 (14)
 (4)
 (24)
 (28)
 (5)
 (25)
 (15)
 (9)
 (2)

Changes in medal standings

References

External links
Athletics at official website
Parathletics at official website

Pan Arab Games
2011
Events at the 2011 Pan Arab Games